Teresita is a diminutive version of the Spanish given name Teresa. People with this name include:

 Teresita Abundo (born 1949), Filipino educator and athlete 
 Teresita Barajuen (1907 – 2013), Spanish Roman Catholic nun
 Teresita de Jesús Borges (born 1965), Mexican politician 
 Teresita Caraveo (born 1961), Mexican politician
 Teresita Castillo (1927 - 2016), Filipino Roman Catholic nun
 Teresita de Castro (born 1948), Filipino judge
 Teresita Collado (born 1971), Guatemalan athlete
 Teresita Fernández (born 1968), American visual artist 
 Teresita Herbosa (born 1950), chairwoman of the Filipino Securities and Exchange Commission
 Teresita Lazaro (born 1942), Filipino politician
 Teresita Manaloto-Magnaye, Filipina short story writer
 Teresita Márquez (born 1992), Filipino actress, model, dancer and beauty queen
 Teresita Quintela, Argentine politician
 Teresita Reyes (born 1950), Chilean actress
 Teresita Sandoval (1811-1894), a founder of Pueblo, Colorado
 Teresita Santos, politician from the Northern Mariana Islands
 Teresita Sy-Coson, Filipina businesswoman
 Teresa Urrea, often referred to as Teresita (1873 – 1906), Mexican mystic, folk healer, and revolutionary insurgent
 Teresita Román Vélez (born 1925), Colombian writer and chef

See also
Teresita (disambiguation)

Feminine given names